Group E of the EuroBasket 2011 took place between 7 to 11 September 2011. The group played all of its games at Siemens Arena in Vilnius, Lithuania.

The group composed of three best ranked teams from groups A and B. The four teams with the best records advanced to the quarterfinals.

Standings

7 September

Germany vs. Spain

Turkey vs. France

Serbia vs. Lithuania

9 September

Spain vs. Serbia

Germany vs. Turkey

Lithuania vs. France

11 September

Serbia vs. Turkey

France vs. Spain

Lithuania vs. Germany

External links
Standings and fixtures

FIBA EuroBasket 2011
2011–12 in Serbian basketball
2011–12 in Spanish basketball
2011–12 in French basketball
2011–12 in Turkish basketball
2011–12 in German basketball
Sports competitions in Vilnius
21st century in Vilnius